"Sauver l'amour" is a 1985 song recorded by French singer Daniel Balavoine. It was the second single from his eighth and last album of the same name and was released posthumously in March 1986. It was a hit in France, although it was not as successful as the previous song, "L'Aziza".

Music, lyrics and versions
Written and composed by Daniel Balavoine, the song deals with various situations of war and misery in the Third World (at that time, the famine ravaged the Ethiopia and there were some conflicts as the war in Iran / Iraq) and the music video shows certain of these situations. The verses use the same form of words to rhyme, but each verse has "its own identity through its musical color". "The first [verse] is smooth, in contrast with the second one in which percussion are very marked".

The song is also available on Balavoine's posthumous greatest hits compilations Sans frontières (2005) on which it appears also in a remixed version, and Les 50 plus belles chansons (2008).

Charts performances and covers
In France, the single went to No. 16 on 16 April 1986 on the SNEP chart, and reached number five seven weeks later. It totaled 18 weeks.

"Sauver l'amour" was covered in 2005 by contestants from the fifth season of Star Academy on its album Chante Daniel Balavoine. and also by Valérie Dall'Anese. Some members of Les Enfoirés performed the song which was included in their 1997 album Le Zénith des Enfoirés.

Track listings
 7" single

 Digital download

Charts

References

1985 songs
1986 singles
Daniel Balavoine songs
Songs released posthumously
Songs written by Daniel Balavoine
Barclay (record label) singles